Saints Constantine and Helena Church may refer to:

Australia
Cathedral of Saints Constantine and Helene

Bulgaria
Church of St Constantine and Helena

Poland
The Orthodox Parish of Saints Constantine and Helen in Zgorzelec

Romania
Focșani Military Chapel
Livedea Gospod Church

Russia
Sts. Constantine and Helen Church, Novocherkassk

Serbia
Church of Saints Emperor Constantine and Empress Helena

Turkey
Church of Sts. Constantine and Helen (Edirne)

United States

Sts. Constantine and Helen Greek Orthodox Cathedral
Saints Constantine and Helen Greek Orthodox Cathedral of the Pacific (Honolulu)
Sts. Constantine and Helen Serbian Orthodox Church
Sts. Constantine and Helen Chapel
Mosque Maryam (former church)